The scrotum or scrotal sac is an anatomical male reproductive structure located at the base of the penis that consists of a suspended dual-chambered sac of skin and smooth muscle. It is present in most terrestrial male mammals. The scrotum contains the external spermatic fascia, testes, epididymis, and ductus deferens. It is a distention of the perineum and carries some abdominal tissues into its cavity including the testicular artery, testicular vein, and pampiniform plexus. The perineal raphe is a small, vertical, slightly raised ridge of scrotal skin under which is found the scrotal septum. It appears as a thin longitudinal line that runs front to back over the entire scrotum. In humans and some other mammals the scrotum becomes covered with pubic hair at puberty. The scrotum will usually tighten during penile erection and when exposed to cold temperatures. One testis is typically lower than the other to avoid compression in the event of an impact.

The scrotum is biologically homologous to the labia majora in females. Although present in most boreoeutherian mammals, the external scrotum is absent in fusiform marine mammals, such as whales and seals, as well as in some lineages of land mammals, such as the afrotherians, xenarthrans, and numerous families of bats, rodents, and insectivores.

Structure

Nerve supply

Blood supply

Skin and glands

The skin on the scrotum is more highly pigmented compared to the rest of the body. The septum is a connective tissue membrane dividing the scrotum into two cavities.

Lymphatic system 
The scrotum lymph drains initially into the superficial inguinal lymph nodes, this then drains into the deep inguinal lymph nodes. The deep inguinal lymph nodes drain into the common iliac which ultimately releases lymph into the cisterna chyli.

Asymmetry 
One testis is typically lower than the other, which is believed to function to avoid compression in the event of impact; in humans, the left testis is typically lower than the right.
An alternative view is that testis descent asymmetry evolved to enable more effective cooling of the testicles.

Internal structure 

Additional tissues and organs reside inside the scrotum and are described in more detail in the following articles:

 Appendix of epididymidis
 Cavity of tunical albuginea
 Cremaster muscle
 Dartos
 Ductus Deferens
 Efferent ductules
 Epididymis
 Leydig cell
 Lobule of testes
 Paradidymis
 Rete testes
 Scrotal septum
 Seminiferous tubule
 Sertoli cell
 Spermatic cord
 Testes
 Tunica albuginea of testis
 Tunica vaginalis parietal layer
 Tunica vaginalis visceral layer
 Tunica vasculosa testis
 Vas deferens

Development

Genital homology between sexes

Male sex hormones are secreted by the testes later in embryonic life to cause the development of secondary sex organs. The scrotum is developmentally homologous to the labia majora. The raphe does not exist in females. Reproductive organs and tissues develop in females and males begin during the fifth week after fertilization.  The genital ridge grows behind the peritoneal membrane.  By the sixth week, string-like tissues called primary sex cords form within the enlarging genital ridge.  Externally, a swelling called the genital tubercule appears over the cloacal membrane.

Up until the eighth week after fertilization, the reproductive organs do not appear to be different between the male and female and are called in-differentiated.  Testosterone secretion starts during week eight, reaches peak levels during week 13 and eventually declines to very low levels by the end of the second trimester. The testosterone causes the masculinization of the labioscrotal folds into the scrotum. The scrotal raphe is formed when the embryonic, urethral groove closes by week 12.

Scrotal growth and puberty 
Though the testes and scrotum form early in embryonic life, sexual maturation begins upon entering puberty. The increased secretion of testosterone causes the darkening of the skin and development of pubic hair on the scrotum.

Function 

Higher temperatures affect spermatogenesis. Temperature control is accomplished by the smooth muscles of the scrotum moving the testicles either closer to or further away from the abdomen dependent upon the ambient temperature. This is accomplished by the cremaster muscle in the abdomen and the dartos fascia (muscular tissue under the skin).

Having the scrotum and testicles situated outside the abdominal cavity may provide additional advantages. The external scrotum is not affected by abdominal pressure. This may prevent the emptying of the testes before the sperm were matured sufficiently for fertilization. Another advantage is it protects the testes from jolts and compressions associated with an active lifestyle. Animals that move at a steady pace – such as elephants, whales, and marsupial moles – have internal testes and no scrotum. Unlike placental mammals, some male marsupials have a scrotum that is anterior to the penis, which is not homologous to the scrotum of placental mammals, although there are several marsupial species without an external scrotum. In humans, the scrotum may provide some friction during intercourse, helping to enhance the activity.

Clinical significance 

A study has indicated that use of a laptop computer positioned on the lap can negatively affect sperm production.

Diseases and conditions 

The scrotum and its contents can develop diseases or incur injuries. These include:

Candidiasis (yeast infection)
sebaceous cyst
epidermal cyst
hydrocele
hematocele
Molluscum contagiosum
spermatocele
Paget's disease of the scrotum
varicocele
inguinal hernia
epididymo-orchitis
testicular torsion
genital warts
testicular cancer
dermatitis
undescended testes
Chyloderma
mumps
scabies
herpes
pubic lice
 Chancroid (Haemophilus ducreyi)
 Chlamydia (Chlamydia trachomatis)
 Gonorrhea (Neisseria gonorrhoeae)
 Granuloma inguinale or (Klebsiella granulomatis)
 Syphilis (Treponema pallidum)
 scrotum eczema
 scrotal psoriasis disease
  Riboflavin deficiency
 Chimney sweeps' carcinoma

See also 

 Scrotal infusion, a temporary form of body modification
 Retroperitoneal lymph node dissection
 Testicular self-examination

Bibliography 

 Books

References 

 
Mammal male reproductive system
Integumentary system
Human male reproductive system
Sex organs
Testicle